The 2015 KBS Drama Awards, presented by Korean Broadcasting System (KBS), took place on December 31, 2015 in Yeouido, Seoul. It was hosted by Jun Hyun-moo, Park Bo-gum and Kim So-hyun.

Winners and nominees
(Winners denoted in bold)

References

External links
 
 

KBS Drama Awards
KBS Drama Awards
KBS Drama Awards